Giovanni Cusatis (born February 1, 1967) is a retired Italian football player, now a coach.

Career

Footballer

He began playing football in Pro Lissone, in Lombardia regional leagues; he spent almost of his career in Serie C1 and C2.

He played both as centre midfielder and winger.

Coach

In 2005, he entered Giacomo Gattuso's staff; then he trained Caronnese and later joined Attilio Lombardo at Legnano.

In 2011–12 he had been hired by Pro Patria as head-coach: the team, which had to recuperate an 11 points-deduction due to financial irregularities, ended the tournament at a remarkable 7th place (could have been the winner if it wasn't for the amends).

In 2012–13 season he signed for Alessandria, in Lega Pro Seconda Divisione.

On 18 December 2013, Cusatis was confirmed as one of Giuseppe Sannino's new assistant coaches at Watford.

References

Bibliography
Almanacco illustrato del Calcio, editions 1990-1999, Modena, Panini.

External links
 Giovanni Cusatis coach profile at TuttoCalciatori.net 
 

1967 births
Living people
Footballers from Milan
Italian footballers
Italian football managers
F.C. Pavia players
Novara F.C. players
A.C. Legnano players
U.S. Alessandria Calcio 1912 managers
Watford F.C. non-playing staff
Association football midfielders